The 2008 Kangaroo Cup was a professional tennis tournament played on outdoor carpet courts. It was the twelfth edition of the tournament which was part of the 2008 ITF Women's Circuit. It took place in Gifu, Japan between 28 April and 4 May 2008. The total prize money offered at this event was US$50,000.

This tournament marked the return of Japanese player Kimiko Date-Krumm, who returned to professional tennis almost 12 years after retiring, at the age of 37. Date entered the qualifying with the help of a wildcard, and she not only qualified, but had a run to the singles final, where she was beaten by Tamarine Tanasugarn. She also won the doubles title here, with compatriot Kurumi Nara.

WTA entrants

Seeds

 1 Rankings are as of April 21, 2008.

Other entrants
The following players received wildcards into the singles main draw:
  Yuka Kuroda
  Kurumi Nara
  Kana Watanabe
  Aki Yamasoto

The following players received entry from the qualifying draw:
  Kimiko Date-Krumm
  Yurina Koshino
  Ksenia Lykina
  Ana Savić

Champions

Singles

 Tamarine Tanasugarn def.  Kimiko Date-Krumm, 4–6, 7–5, 6–2

Doubles

 Kimiko Date-Krumm /  Kurumi Nara def.  Melanie South /  Nicole Thijssen, 6–1, 6–7(8–10), [10–7]

External links
 ITF search

References

Kangaroo Cup
2008 in Japanese tennis
2008 in Japanese women's sport
Kangaroo Cup